South Common may refer to:

South Common Historic District, Lowell, Massachusetts, United States
South Common Centre Bus Terminal, Mississauga, Ontario, Canada
South Edmonton Common, Edmonton, Alberta, Canada